The Williams-Harrison House (a.k.a. Harrison House) is located in Roseland, Essex County, New Jersey, United States. The house was added to the New Jersey Register of Historic Places on November 24, 1978 and the National Register of Historic Places on March 13, 1979.

History
The Williams-Harrison House was built circa 1824 by Amos Williams, Jr. after purchasing 98 acres from the estate of Adonijah Edison. The property was later reduced to a seven-acre family farm with livestock, chicken coops, fruit trees, a vegetable garden and outhouses used for the practice of tanning and shoemaking. It is an example of rural Federal architecture.

See also
National Register of Historic Places listings in Essex County, New Jersey

References

Houses on the National Register of Historic Places in New Jersey
Federal architecture in New Jersey
Houses completed in 1824
Houses in Essex County, New Jersey
National Register of Historic Places in Essex County, New Jersey
New Jersey Register of Historic Places
Roseland, New Jersey